Potemnemus rosenbergii is a species of beetle in the family Cerambycidae. It was described by Vollenhoven in 1871, originally with the genus misspelled as "Protemnemus". It is known from Papua New Guinea.

References

Lamiini
Beetles described in 1871